Adrian Damman of Bysterveldt was an ambassador of the Dutch Republic in Scotland in the 1590s. He was an author, and taught at the University of Edinburgh.

Damman was godfather or a baptismal witness to a son of Adrian Vanson, a Flemish portrait painter working in Edinburgh, and a daughter of Jacques de Bousie a confectioner.<ref>'Extracts from the Register of Baptisms', Edinburgh', vol. 4 (Edinburgh, 1888), p. 174: Michael Apted & Susan Hannabuss, Dictionary of Painters in Scotland (Edinburgh, 1978), p. 98, citing  National Records of Scotland, Old Parish Records, Edinburgh, vol. 1, fols. 9, 32, 59, 101.</ref> The Lord Chancellor of Scotland, John Maitland died on 3 October 1595. James Vi composed an epitaph and Damman translated it into Latin.

In February 1598, Damman became involved in controversy when he contributed a succession tract, a pamphlet arguing that James VI of Scotland should become King of England. The English diplomat George Nicholson reported that David Foulis had directed the printer Robert Waldegrave to publish a Latin succession tract written by Walter Quinn, a tutor to Prince Henry and corrected and edited by Damman. Such works argued that James VI should be Elizabeth's successor. Waldegrave was reluctant to print it. No copies of this work are known to have survived. This work was A Pithie Exhortation to her Majesty for Establishing a Successor to the Crown, printed by Waldegrave in 1598.

Works
Published works of Ardrian Damman include:
 Schediasmata Hadr. Damanis a Bisterveld gandavensis (Edinburgh, Robert Waldegrave, 1590), a description of the voyages of James VI of Scotland and Anne of Denmark and their wedding.
  Bartasias; de mundi creatione'' (Edinburgh, Robert Waldegrave, 1600), a translation of works by Guillaume de Salluste Du Bartas, a poet admired by James VI.

References

Ambassadors of the Dutch Republic to Scotland
Dutch nobility